Gonioma is a genus of moths of the family Xyloryctidae.

Species
 Gonioma hospita (Felder & Rogenhofer, 1875)
 Gonioma hypoxantha (Lower, 1894)

References

Xyloryctidae
Xyloryctidae genera